Trillemarka (Trillemarka - Rollagsfjell) is a  nature reserve located in Buskerud, Norway.  It was created on December 13, 2002, and is located in the hill- and mountain areas between Nore in Numedal and Solevann in Sigdal, partially in the municipalities of Sigdal, Nore og Uvdal, and Rollag.  The nature reserve consists of one of the largest natural forest areas in central Østlandet and includes virgin forest and 93 red list species.

The Norwegian government decided on January 8, 2008, that  is to be protected. The landowners received NOK 100 million in compensation.

Controversy 
There has been a large controversy between environmentalists and the owners of the forest. As a consequence of the debate there has been suggested four different sizes for an expansion of the nature reserve:

 205–210 km2 (suggested by the Norwegian Institute for Nature Research, supported by environmentalists)
 169 km2 (suggested by the governor)
 147 km2 (suggested by the governor)
 99 km2 (suggested by the forest owners)

Among the environmentalist organizations that have taken an interest in Trillemarka, are Natur og Ungdom, WWF, and  Friends of the Earth, Norway.

References

External links
 Unofficial info site

Nature reserves in Norway
Sigdal